Grethe Mathiesen (born 10 April 1956) is a Norwegian swimmer. She was born in Kirkenes. She competed at the 1972 Summer Olympics in Munich, in the women's 100 metre freestyle.

She won five national titles and two Nordic titles in 100 metre freestyle.

References

External links
 

1956 births
Living people
People from Sør-Varanger
Norwegian female freestyle swimmers
Olympic swimmers of Norway
Swimmers at the 1972 Summer Olympics
Sportspeople from Troms og Finnmark
20th-century Norwegian women